Films produced in Sri Lanka in the 1970s.

1970

1971

1972

1973

1974

1975

1976

1977

1978

1979

See also
 Cinema of Sri Lanka
 List of Sri Lankan films

1970s
Films
Sri Lanka